PFN may refer to:

Business and organisations
 Parti des forces nouvelles (Party of New Forces), a French far right political party formed in 1974
 Party of New Forces (Belgium) (Parti des forces nouvelles), a Belgian far right political party formed in 1975
 Produksi Film Negara, an Indonesian film company

Technology
 Pulse forming network, an electric circuit
 Page frame number, of computer memory in an operating system

Other uses
 Panama City–Bay County International Airport (IATA code), a former airport in Florida, US